Rotokawa  is a rural community  in the Taupo District and Waikato region of New Zealand's North Island.

Marae

The suburb has two Te Ure o Uenukukōpako marae.

Ruamatā Marae and Uenukukōpako meeting house is a meeting place for the hapū of Ngati Te Kanawa.

Pikirangi Marae and Ohomairangi meeting house is a meeting place of hapū of Ngāti Hauora. In October 2020, the Government committed $4,525,104 from the Provincial Growth Fund to upgrade Pikirangi Marae and Poukani Marae, creating 34 jobs.

References

Taupō District
Populated places in Waikato